Qaisumah or Al Qaysumah is a village belonging to the city of Hafar al-Batin, in Eastern Province (also known as Ash Sharqiyah), Saudi Arabia.

The weather in Qaisumah is extreme, with rainfall ranging between 5–10 mm. Summer temperatures ranges from 45 to 51 degrees Celsius. Whereas the winter temperatures may go below freezing point (between -1 to 6 degrees Celsius), with the lowest temperature recorded is -6 degree Celsius. The town has 100% Islam religion with no minorities in and around the town.

Climate

References

 
Populated places in Eastern Province, Saudi Arabia